The 2006–07 Old Dominion Monarchs basketball team represented Old Dominion University in National Collegiate Athletic Association (NCAA) Division I men's basketball during the 2008–09 season. Playing in the Colonial Athletic Association (CAA) and led by sixth-year head coach Blaine Taylor, the Monarchs finished the season with a 24–9 overall record (15–3 CAA). After finishing second in the CAA regular season standings, Old Dominion fell in the semifinal round of the CAA Tournament but still secured an at-large bid to the NCAA Tournament. Playing as the No. 12 seed in the Midwest region, ODU lost to No. 5 seed Butler in the opening round.

Roster

Schedule and results

|-
!colspan=9 style=| Exhibition

|-
!colspan=9 style=| Regular Season

|-
!colspan=9 style=| CAA Tournament

|-
!colspan=9 style=| NCAA Tournament

References

Old Dominion Monarchs men's basketball seasons
Old Dominion
Old Dominion
Old Dominion Monarchs Basketball Team
Old Dominion Monarchs Basketball Team